Michelle Chapman (born 1988), known professionally as Tori Black, is an American pornographic actress. In 2011, she became the first person to win the AVN Female Performer of the Year Award two years in a row. She was inducted in the XRCO and AVN Halls of Fame.

Early life and education 
Chapman is a native of Seattle. She studied journalism as an undergraduate at Western Washington University.

Career 
Chapman started her career at age 18 in Fort Lauderdale, Florida, where she was on a summer vacation while attending college. At her parents' insistence on getting a job, Chapman saw an advertisement for an adult talent agency and sent in her pictures. The agency accepted and, after considering their offer, she accepted and returned to the agency a week later. She was the Penthouse Pet of the Month for December 2008.

Chapman is the first person in history to win two AVN Female Performer of the Year Awards, winning back-to-back years in 2010 and 2011. She also won the 2010 and 2011 XRCO Awards for Female Performer of the Year. In 2011, she was also named by CNBC as one of the 12 most popular stars in porn and CNBC noted her role as Catwoman in Vivid Entertainment's Batman XXX: A Porn Parody, as well as her 2010 wins by AVN and XBIZ and 2011 AVN win and XBIZ nomination as Female Performer of the Year.

Chapman had a guest starring role in episode 3, "Gem and Loan", of season 2 of the Showtime series Ray Donovan where she played porn star Lexi Steele. She also appeared in the film L.A. Slasher.

In 2010, Chapman was named by Loaded magazine as the most facially attractive female performer in the industry.

Chapman made her directorial debut with a video for Elegant Angels' website, featuring their Girl of the Month for June 2014, Alina Li.

In 2017, Chapman, credited as Tori Black, had a small part in the supernatural musical thriller film American Satan.

In March 2020, she featured in KP Wolfe's music video "You Can Call Me".

Personal life 
In 2011, Chapman announced that she had given birth to a son.
She wrote that she was pregnant with her second child in 2013.

Awards 

Other nominations
 2009 AVN nominations
 2010 NightMoves nominations
 2012 AVN nominations
 2012 XBIZ nominations
 2012 XRCO nominations
 2013 AVN nominations

References

External links 

 
 
 
 

1988 births
21st-century American actresses
American female adult models
American pornographic film actresses
Living people
Penthouse Pets